The 2017–18 Israeli Basketball Premier League, for sponsorship reasons Ligat Winner, was the 64th season of the Israeli Basketball Premier League. Hapoel Jerusalem is the defending champion.

Competition format
Twelve teams join the regular season, where they play against each other four times home-and-away in double a round-robin format. The eight first qualified teams advance to the playoffs. The last qualified team is relegated to the Liga Leumit. The regular season starts 8 October 2017.

Teams

Ironi Nes Ziona has been promoted to the league after winning 2016–17 National League, and comes back just one year after their relegation. Maccabi Kiryat Gat, who finished in last place during the 2016–17 season, relegated to the Liga Leumit

Stadia and locations

Personnel and sponsorship

Managerial changes

Regular season
In the regular season, teams play against each other at least three times home-and-away in double a round-robin format. The six first qualified teams advance to the playoffs. The regular season started on 8 October 2017.

Standings

Players strike 
On May 22, 2018, the Israeli Basketball Players Association announced a strike after the league introduced a rule, which enforced the teams to have at least two Israeli players on court at the same time. On May 24, the league announced that the season would be ended with one regular season game remaining and that no playoffs would be held due to the ongoing strike.

However, on May 25, 2018, the Israeli League Management have reached an agreement with the Israeli Basketball Players Association and the strike ended.

Play-offs

|}
Source: Ligat Winner

Final Four

Clubs in European competitions

Final standings

All-Star Game
The 2018 Israeli League All-star event was held on March 2, 2018, at the Menora Mivtachim Arena in Tel Aviv. 

The International team won the game 137–122. The MVP of the game was Pierre Jackson who scored 18 points along with 6 assists. 

Corey Webster won the Three-Point Shootout  and Jaron Johnson won the Slam Dunk Contest.

Rosters

Game

Three-point shootout

Source: Basket.co.il

Slam Dunk Contest

Source: Basket.co.il

Statistical leaders

|  style="width:50%; vertical-align:top;"|

Assists

|}
|}

|  style="width:50%; vertical-align:top;"|

Efficiency

|}
|}

Other statistics

Source: Basket.co.il

Individual game highs

Source: RealGM

Awards

Yearly awards

Regular season MVP

Source: basket.co.il

Finals MVP

Source: basket.co.il

All-Israeli League Teams

Source: basket.co.il

Coach of the Year

Source: basket.co.il

Quarterfinals MVP

Source: basket.co.il

Best Defender

Source: basket.co.il

Most Improved Player

Source: basket.co.il

Sixth Man of the Year

Source: basket.co.il

Rising Star

Source: basket.co.il

Monthly Awards

Player of the Month

Israeli Player of the Month

Coach of the Month

MVP of the Round

Average attendances
Included playoffs games.

See also
2017–18 Israeli Basketball State Cup
2017 Israeli Basketball League Cup

References

Israeli Basketball Premier League seasons
Israeli
Basketball